Maxim Power Corp. is an Independent Power Producer headquartered in Calgary, Alberta, Canada and owns and operates the H. R. Milner Plant ("M2"), a 204 MW natural-gas fired power plant near Grande Cache, Alberta. Maxim is currently increasing the capacity of M2 to approximately 300 MW and concurrently will realise an improvement in fuel efficiency by investing in heat recovery combined cycle technology. The company is focused on power generation opportunities in Alberta, Canada including both renewable and traditional thermal options. It was founded on July 9, 1993.

The company's wholly owned subsidiary, Summit Coal, has coal leases in the province of Alberta.

Generating facilities 
Maxim Generating stations are either owner directly by Maxim Power or through subsidiaries.

Canadian facilities

References and footnotes

External links
Maxim Power Corporation

Companies listed on the Toronto Stock Exchange
Companies based in Calgary